Sarah Maguire (26 March 1957 – 2 November 2017) was a British poet, translator and broadcaster.

Life
Born in London, Sarah Maguire left school early to train as a gardener with the London Borough of Ealing (1974–77). Her horticultural career had a significant impact on her poetry: her third collection of poems The Florist's at Midnight (Jonathan Cape, 2001) brought together all her poems about plants and gardens, and she edited the anthology Flora Poetica: the Chatto Book of Botanical Verse (2001). She was also Poet in Residence at Chelsea Physic Garden, and edited A Green Thought in a Green Shade, essays by poets who have worked in a garden environment, published at the conclusion of this residency.

Maguire was the first writer to be sent to Palestine (1996) and Yemen (1998) by the British Council. As a result of these visits she developed a strong interest in Arabic literature; she translated the Palestinian poets Mahmoud Darwish and Ghassan Zaqtan and the Sudanese poet, Al-Saddiq Al-Raddi (2008). With Yama Yari, Maguire co-translated the Afghan poet Partaw Naderi (2008); their translation of A Thousand Rooms of Dream and Fear by the leading Afghan novelist, Atiq Rahimi (Chatto & Windus, 2006) was longlisted for the Independent Foreign Fiction Prize in 2007.

She was the only living English-language poet with a book in print in Arabic - her collection of selected poems, Haleeb Muraq (Dar-Al Mada, 2003), was translated by the leading Iraqi poet Saadi Yousef. Maguire was the founder and director of the Poetry Translation Centre, which opened in 2004.

The Sarah Maguire Prize for Poetry in Translation was launched by the Poetry Translation Centre on 12 September 2019 to recognise and encourage quality translation of poetry into English.

Awards
 2008: Cholmondeley Award
 2001-03; Royal Literary Fund Writing Fellow at School of Oriental & African Studies, University of London

Works

Poetry Books

Edited

Translations

Anthologies

References

External links
 "Sarah Maguire", The British Council
 James Byrne, "Interview", Wolf Magazine

1957 births
2017 deaths
English women poets
Writers from London
20th-century British poets
21st-century British poets
20th-century English women writers
20th-century English writers
21st-century English women writers